Jadel Abdul Ghani Gregório (born 16 September 1980 in Jandaia do Sul, Paraná) is a Brazilian athlete competing in long jump and triple jump. Based in São Paulo, he has competed in several international championships since 2001.  His jump of 17.90m is the South American and Brazilian record and ranks him tied for eighth best ever.

He was a competitor for Brazil in the 2008 Summer Olympics. The Chinese hosts constructed an extension to his bed to accommodate his 2.03 meter (6 ft 8 in) frame.

After marrying Samara Abdul Ghani, his Lebanese physiotherapist, in 2005 Gregório converted to Islam and changed his legal name to Jadel Abdul Ghani Gregório. Samara has since given birth to their first child, Jade, and to their second child, Sahara.

In Brazil Grand Prix of athletics, organized in Belém, of May 28, 2007, Jadel Gregório broke the record South-American and Brazilian of triple jump, obtaining a mark of 17.90 meters. This Jump, at the time, moved him up to the 6th place on the world all-time list, behind only Jonathan Edwards (18,29m), Kenny Harrison (18,09m), Willie Banks (17,97m), Khristo Markov (17,92m) e James Beckford (17,92m).

Personal bests
Outdoor
Long jump - 8.22 m (2004)
Triple jump - 17.90 m (2007)

Indoor
Long jump - 7.82 m (2005)
Triple jump - 17.56 m (2006)

Competition record

Notes and references

External links

1980 births
Living people
Brazilian male triple jumpers
Brazilian male long jumpers
Athletes (track and field) at the 2004 Summer Olympics
Athletes (track and field) at the 2008 Summer Olympics
Olympic athletes of Brazil
Athletes (track and field) at the 2003 Pan American Games
Athletes (track and field) at the 2007 Pan American Games
Pan American Games athletes for Brazil
World Athletics Championships medalists
People from Jandaia do Sul
Brazilian Muslims
Converts to Islam
Pan American Games gold medalists for Brazil
Pan American Games silver medalists for Brazil
Pan American Games medalists in athletics (track and field)
Universiade medalists in athletics (track and field)
Universiade bronze medalists for Brazil
Medalists at the 2001 Summer Universiade
Medalists at the 2003 Pan American Games
Medalists at the 2007 Pan American Games
Sportspeople from Paraná (state)
21st-century Brazilian people